Mentel is a surname. Notable people with the surname include:

 Bibian Mentel (1972–2021), Dutch snowboarder
 Michael C. Mentel, American politician
 Miroslav Mentel (born 1962), Slovak footballer

See also
 Halib Mentel, village in Eritrea
 Mendel (name)